The Football League Super Cup (known for sponsorship reasons as the ScreenSport Super Cup) was a one-off football club competition held in England in the 1985–86 season. It was organised by the Football League and was intended as a form of financial and sporting compensation for the English clubs which had qualified for European competition in the previous season but had been banned from entering European tournaments by UEFA following the Heysel Stadium disaster. With the ban set to last into the foreseeable future, England's clubs stood to lose a great deal of revenue, and would also have fewer opportunities to win silverware, so the Super Cup was established in order to hopefully offset at least some of this lost income, as well as offering additional competition for them.

The Football League's original intention was to hold the Super Cup annually for the duration of the UEFA ban on English clubs (which ultimately turned out to be five years) but the competition was largely seen as a poor substitute for the glamour of European tournaments and offered nothing different from the two domestic knockout competitions that already existed, the FA Cup and League Cup. Consequently, it generated minimal interest from the clubs involved. With the competition's final postponed until the beginning of the following season due to fixture congestion, the Super Cup was ultimately abolished after only one tournament had been held.

Interest in the competition was so low that the Football League initially failed to attract any form of sponsorship for it. Cable TV sports channel Screensport agreed to sponsor the tournament's final in September 1986.

Format
The six clubs invited to participate, and the European competitions they would have qualified for, were:
 Everton (Football League champions, European Cup)
 Manchester United (FA Cup winners, European Cup Winners' Cup)
 Norwich City (League Cup winners, UEFA Cup)
 Liverpool (UEFA Cup)
 Tottenham Hotspur (UEFA Cup)
 Southampton (UEFA Cup)

To create a sufficient number of games, the teams played each other home and away in two groups of three teams, with three points awarded for a win and one point for a draw, with the top two teams in each group advancing to the semi-finals. Both the semi-finals and the final were to be held over two legs, home and away, which was perhaps another factor which may have contributed to the competition's failure to attract much interest from the clubs participating, as the tournament did not offer the prospect of a day out at Wembley for the finalists.

Competition history
Merseyside rivals Liverpool and Everton won through to the final, but with both these clubs being involved in a battle for the league championship and both of them also reaching the FA Cup final (as well as Liverpool being involved in the semi-finals of the Football League Cup), fixture congestion became a problem, with Liverpool's semi-final second leg having to be delayed until the final week of the season, two days before the FA Cup final. The English football season had to come to an end immediately following the FA Cup final due to the preparations for the imminent FIFA World Cup in Mexico (which many Everton and Liverpool players were to be involved in), which meant that there was no opportunity for the delayed Super Cup final to be played after the FA Cup final and that the Super Cup tournament could not be concluded before the 1985–86 season ended. 

The absence of any conclusion of the Super Cup before the season's end may have put paid to any possibility of a second Super Cup tournament being organised in the 1986–87 season, although the perceived failure of the inaugural competition and its unpopularity with the clubs made such an eventuality unlikely in any case. (If the 1986–87 Super Cup had been staged, it would have been contested by Liverpool, Everton, West Ham United, Manchester United, Sheffield Wednesday and Oxford United).

Ultimately the 1985–86 Super Cup final had to be held over until the following season and was finally played in September 1986, by which point the competition had finally attracted some sponsorship. Everton, however, fielded a virtual reserve team in the two-legged final (although they were in the middle of a genuine injury crisis) and Liverpool won the trophy 7–2 on aggregate. The games are remembered for Ian Rush's impressive haul of five goals for Liverpool over the two games (although these goals are sometimes excluded from his official record-breaking Merseyside derby tally) and for Kevin Sheedy's spectacular goal for Everton at Anfield, scored from a long-range free-kick at the Kop end. Having lost the League and Cup double to Liverpool the previous May, Everton later that season managed to pip Liverpool to the League Championship.

The Super Cup was not seen as a success, as it was felt to be a very poor substitute for games against the best sides in Europe in prestigious UEFA competitions, with attendances at the matches generally being poor and with the clubs taking part apparently regarding the tournament as a little more than a pointless addition to the match calendar and a source of fixture congestion. Consequently, the Super Cup was abolished after only one season and it has not been held since. The competition is now largely forgotten.

Similar competitions
The Full Members' Cup, another Football League cup competition also launched in 1985 for similar reasons (to create additional competition, revenue and opportunity for silverware for English clubs, as well as a final at Wembley Stadium), fared marginally better and ran until 1992, often better remembered as the "ZDS Cup" due to that competition being sponsored by Zenith Data Systems. 
A similar competition to the Super Cup, the Mercantile Credit Centenary Trophy was played in the early weeks of 1988–89 to celebrate the league's 100th birthday between the top eight Football League teams from the previous season. The competition, played over three rounds on a knock-out basis, was won by Arsenal.

Group stage

Group 1

Group 2

Knockout stage

Semi-finals

First leg

Second leg

Everton won 3–1 on aggregate

Liverpool won 4–2 on aggregate

Final

First leg

Second leg

Liverpool won 7–2 on aggregate

Top goalscorers

References

External links
The story of the Super Cup

Defunct English Football League competitions
Defunct football cup competitions in England
1985–86 in English football
1985 establishments in England
1986 disestablishments in England